Young Island is an uninhabited member of the Arctic Archipelago in the territory of Nunavut. It lies in the Parry Channel, southwest of Lowther Island, and northeast of Hamilton Island.

Two more Young Islands lie within Nunavut. One is a member of the Low Islands, in Ungava Bay, near Aupaluk; the other is a member of the Hopewell Islands, in Hudson Bay, near Inukjuak.

References

External links 
 Young Island in the Atlas of Canada - Toporama; Natural Resources Canada
 Young Island (Hopewell Islands) in the Atlas of Canada - Toporama; Natural Resources Canada
 Young Island (Low Islands) in the Atlas of Canada - Toporama; Natural Resources Canada

Uninhabited islands of Qikiqtaaluk Region